The 2017 Bangladesh Premier League Final was a day/night Twenty20 cricket match played between the Dhaka Dynamites and the Rangpur Riders on 12 December 2017 at the Sher-e-Bangla National Cricket Stadium, Dhaka to determine the winner of the 2017–18 Bangladesh Premier League, a professional Twenty20 cricket league in Bangladesh. It ended as Rangpur Riders defeating Dhaka Dynamites by 57 runs.

Route to final

Dhaka was placed second on the league table with 15 points, though Rangpur was ranked fourth in the league stage with 12 points, as per NRR. Dhaka won 7 of their league stage matches, lost 4 and 1 resulted in no result due to rain. On the other hand, Rangpur both won and lost 6 matches. Dhaka won the qualifier 1 match and grabbed the final. Barisal won the eliminator and qualifier 2 one after one, booking their place in the final.

League stage

Note: The points at the end of each group match are listed.
Note: Click on the points to see the summary for the match.

Play-offs

Preliminary

Eliminator

Qualifier 1

Qualifier 2

Final

Background
The match is to be played at the home ground of Dhaka, Sher-e-Bangla National Cricket Stadium. Dhaka is appearing in their fourth final and have won the championship in all their previous finals. Rangpur is appearing in their first ever final match. Both teams were on even terms as they have won the matches against each other this season. The total attendance of the final match was 25792 (Reference from BCB)

Report
Dhaka won the toss and decided to bowl first. The decision was proving to be successful when they got rid of Johnson Charles early thanks to skipper Shakib Al Hasan. But after the 10th over, the partnership of Brendon McCullum and Chris Gayle proved to be devastating. Their partnership mainly consisted of boundaries and particularly Gayle, who hit a record 18 sixes. His score of 146 off 69 balls is the tournament highest. McCullum gave him a helping hand by scoring a decent 51 off 43. The Rangpur innings thus ended as 206 for 1.

The second innings started with Dhaka quickly losing wickets. At a time they 87 for 7 due to the excellent bowling by Rangpur bowlers. Jahurul Islam provided some resistance with his 50 off 38 balls. But soon wickets tumbled down and Dhaka innings came to an end with 149/9, handing Rangpur 57 runs victory and also the championship.

Summary
Chris Gayle was awarded as the man of the match for his aforementioned innings and also won the man of the series award. The highest run scorer award was also awarded to him and the most wicket taker award was given to Shakib Al Hasan.

References

External links

Premier League Final
Bangladesh Premier League Finals
Bangladesh Premier League Final